Generalbezirk Estland (General District Estonia) was one of the four administrative subdivisions of Reichskommissariat Ostland, the 1941-1945 civilian occupation regime established by Nazi Germany for the administration of the three Baltic countries (Estonia, Latvia and Lithuania) and the western part of the Byelorussian SSR.

Organization and Structure 
Generalbezirk Estland was the last of the four districts to be formally established on 5 December 1941. It was organized on the territory of German-occupied Estonia, which had until then been under the military administration of the Wehrmacht's Army Group North. The capital of Generalbezirk Estland was Tallinn (Reval).

Administrative divisions

Generalbezirk Estland had the following seven subdivisions called Kreisgebiete (County Areas). The seat of administration is in parentheses.
Arensburg (Kuressaare)
Dorpat (Tartu)
Narwa (Rakvere)
Pernau (Pärnu)
Petschur (Pechory)
Reval-Stadt (Tallinn)
Reval-Land (Paide)

Civil and Police Leadership 
Civil administration was led by a Generalkommissar (General Commissioner) directly appointed by Adolf Hitler, and who reported to Ostland Reichskommissar Hinrich Lohse, headquartered in Riga. In addition, police and security matters were overseen by an SS and Police Leader (SSPF) directly appointed by Reichsführer-SS Heinrich Himmler, and who reported to the Higher SS and Police Leader (HSSPF) Ostland und Russland-Nord in Riga, SS-Gruppenführer Hans-Adolf Prützmann until 1 November 1941, and SS-Obergruppenführer Friedrich Jeckeln after that date.

Generalkommissar: Karl-Siegmund Litzmann (5 December 1941 –  17 September 1944).
SS and Police Leader: SS-Brigadeführer Hinrich Möller (4 August 1941 – 1 April 1944); SS-Brigadeführer Walther Schröder (1 April 1944 – 19 October 1944).

Holocaust 

Following the German invasion in June 1941, the death squads of Einsatzgruppe A and their Estonian collaborators immediately began the systematic murder of Estonian Jews. Approximately 75% of Estonian Jews had fled eastward into the Soviet Union ahead of the Nazi occupation. Virtually all of those who remained (between 950 and 1,000 people) were murdered. The Estonian International Commission for Investigation of Crimes Against Humanity estimated the total number of victims killed in Estonia to be roughly 35,000, including approximately 1,000 Estonian Jews, 10,000 foreign Jews, 1000 Estonian Romani, 7000 ethnic Estonians and 15,000 Soviet prisoners of war.

Dissolution 
On 17 September 1944, the Red Army launched the Tallinn offensive and Litzmann departed for Hungary. The city was abandoned by the German forces on 22 September and fell to the Soviets, who captured the rest of mainland Estonia by 26 September and Generalbezirk Estland effectively ceased to exist. Administration of those parts of Estonia still under German occupation reverted to military administration under Army Group North.

See also 
German occupation of Estonia during World War II
The Holocaust in Estonia

References

 
Estonia in World War II
Reichskommissariat Ostland
States and territories disestablished in 1944
States and territories established in 1941
World War II occupied territories